With Honor Action is a - 501(c)4 nonprofit in the United States, led by military veterans that focuses on promoting and advancing principled veteran leadership in order to reduce political polarization.

With Honor Action's mission is to promote and advance principled, veteran leadership in public service through education/advocacy programs, grants, and charitable contributions.

History
Rye Barcott, David Gergen, Peter Dixon, and other veterans co-founded With Honor Action in early 2017 to support principled military veterans elected to Congress and helps amplify their cross-partisan agenda that finds solutions for the American people.

Pledge
With Honor Action believes veterans should abide by The With Honor Pledge to put principles before politics, and lead with civility, integrity, and courage, including the courage to take specific actions like meeting with someone from another party at least once a month and sponsoring legislation with a member of another party at least once a year.

Advisors and partners

With Honor Action's advisory board includes post-9/11 veterans and Gold Star family members among other national leaders including Secretary George Shultz, Secretary Robert Gates, Admiral Michael Mullen, Michèle Flournoy, David Gergen, Chris Howard, Ryan Manion, and Medal of Honor recipient Florent Groberg.

With Honor Action is partnered with the U.S. Competitiveness Project, which is led by the office of Michael Porter. The project has identified the polarization of U.S. political institutions as one of the top strategic threats to U.S. economic competitiveness. In a 2017 report, Why Competition in the Politics Industry is Failing America, Michael Porter and Katherine Gehl wrote: "Politics in America is not a hopeless problem, though it is easy to feel this way given what we experience and read about every day. There are promising reforms already gaining traction including important elements of the strategy we propose. It is up to us as citizens to recapture our democracy—it will not be self-correcting."

Press
With Honor Action has garnered significant attention from TIME, Reuters, and other major media outlets. Through its bipartisan advocacy work, With Honor Action supported efforts to reduce the tax burden on Gold Star families – families who have lost a loved one in military service – as reported by TIME and The Hill and to expand national service programs like AmeriCorps as reported by the Washington Post and NBC News, among other work.

References

Political organizations based in the United States
2017 establishments in North Carolina
Organizations established in 2017